Luria can refer to:

 Luria (gastropod), a genus of sea snail
 Luria gens, an ancient Roman family
 Luria (play), a play by Robert Browning, published in 1846

People 

Luria is a surname, a variant of Lurie. It may refer to:

 Alexander Luria (1902–1977), Russian neuropsychologist
Elaine Luria, member of the U.S. House of Representatives from Virginia's 2nd district, and former United States Navy Commander.
 Isaac Luria (1534–1572), Jewish mystic from Safed
 Johanan Luria, Alsatian Talmudist
 Roger de Luria (c. 1245–1305), Sicilian/Aragonese admiral
 Salvador Luria (1912–1991), Italian microbiologist
 Solomon Luria (1510–1573), Ashkenazic rabbi